Koç University is a non-profit private university in Istanbul, Turkey. It started education in temporary buildings in İstinye in 1993, and moved to its current Rumelifeneri campus near Sarıyer in 2000. Koç University is ranked highest in Turkey according to the 2022 Times Higher Education World University Rankings and 2022 QS World University Rankings. Koç University currently consists of Colleges of Social Sciences and Humanities, Administrative Sciences and Economics, Science, Engineering, Law, Nursing and Medicine. Koç University offers 22 undergraduate, 29 graduate and 30 PhD programs. The university is home to around 7,000 students. The university accepts international students from various countries and has an extensive network of over 250 partner-universities including University of California and other universities such as Northwestern University, Cornell University and Georgetown University.

Founded in 1993, Koç University has become one of the most prestigious universities in Turkey. The university attracts many of the highest-scoring students from Turkey's top high schools such as Koç School, Robert College, Uskudar American Academy and Istanbul High School. The majority of classes (over 95%) at Koç University are taught in English (a few exceptions are found only in the School of Law and School of Nursing).

Faculties, departments and schools
Koç University has the following academic units:
 College of Administrative Sciences and Economics (CASE)
 College of Sciences (CS)
 College of Social Sciences and Humanities (CSSH)
 College of Engineering (CE)
 Law School
 School of Medicine (SOM)
 School of Nursing (SON)
 Graduate School of Business (GSB)
 Graduate School of Sciences & Engineering (GSSE)
 Graduate School of Social Sciences & Humanities (GSSSH)
 Health Sciences Institute (GSHS)

Rankings

The Times Higher Education World University Rankings ranked Koç University as follows:

The same organization listed Koç University as follows in their annual World University Rankings by Subject:

Other rankings such as the QS World University Rankings largely agree with the Times Rankings.

Graduate School of Business 
The QS World University Rankings: Business Masters Rankings 2018 ranked Koç University Graduate School of Business Master programs in Finance and Management as follows:

The Financial Times rankings place Koç University Graduate School of Business and its programs as follows:

Financial Times European Business School Rankings

Financial Times Executive MBA Ranking

In 2017, the CEMS Masters in International Management (CEMS MIM) was ranked 9th in the Financial Times Masters in Management Ranking. Koç University Graduate School of Business is one of the 30 university members of the CEMS Alliance of Business Schools offering this program.

Research 
Koç University is one of the leading research universities in Turkey and the region. The university strives to be a global center of research and aims to influence intellectual, technological, economic and social developments on a global scale.

Koç University has been the top recipient of TÜBİTAK (Scientific and Technological Research Council of Turkey) research awards. Koç University is also the most successful higher education institution in Turkey in bids for ERC grants, coordinating 8 of the 15 active projects in Turkey as of March 2018. In addition, Koç University is the best performing institution (including industry organizations) in Turkey after TÜBİTAK in the European Commission's Horizon 2020 funding scheme. The university is currently hosting 10.2 million Euros worth of Horizon 2020 projects.

Between 2004 and 2017 the university was awarded a total of 761 externally funded projects valued at 320 million TL (US$86 million).

The university has 132 research laboratories, 20 research centers, and 5 research and education forums.

People

Presidents
 Seha Tiniç (1993–2001)
 Attila Aşkar (2001–2009)
 Umran Inan (2009–present)

Notable professors
 İrşadi Aksun
 Tekin Dereli
 Çiğdem Kağıtçıbaşı
 K. Aslihan Yener
 Ziya Onis
 Amir Hetsroni

Sports
Students of Koç University founded the American football team Koç Rams, also known as the Istanbul Rams which will play in the European League of Football in the 2022 season.

Campus

History 
Koç University's central campus at Rumelifeneri is located north of Istanbul, overlooking the Bosphorus and the Black Sea. The campus has 60 buildings, covering 230,000 square meters of built area.

The university first began operations in 1993 in converted factory buildings in Istinye, Sariyer. After the university moved to its new home at Rumelifeneri, the Istinye campus was remodelled to serve as a high-end conference and training center. Other Koç University campuses and locations include West Campus dormitories and residences (Rumelifenri, Sariyer), Koç University Hospital (Topkapi, Istanbul), ANAMED (Beyoğlu, Istanbul), KWORKS (Şişli, Istanbul), AKMED (Antalya), and VEKAM (Ankara).

The Koç University Suna Kıraç Library has five branches and holds some 322,000 print volumes plus nearly 160,000 ebooks and 64,000 online serial titles. The Library also holds about 2,000 rare materials in the areas of Ottoman and European history, literature and religion.

Architecture 

Koç University's Rumelifeneri campus was designed by prominent Boston based American-Iranian architect Mozhan Khadem. Khadem is the chief design architect of all Koç University buildings as well as the master planner of its campus.

According to Khadem, the architecture of the campus was inspired by light and the significance of the university's geographical location on the border between Europe and Asia. Khadem also sites inspiration from Turkish artistic and poetic heritage, the works of the Sufi poet Rumi, and Turkish and Ottoman architectural styles.

The campus is laid out along an east–west axis: architecturally the university represents a ‘gateway of knowledge and light’, symbolized by the university's ‘Portal of Knowledge’ – the campus's arched main entrance represents both a gateway of knowledge and a gateway between East and West. Situated among hills overlooking the Black Sea, the stepped architecture allows the campus to integrate within the steep contours of the surrounding terrain.

The campus consists of a series of connected buildings surrounding a variety of interlocking courtyards. These courtyards draw on Ottoman architectural tradition and are replete with symbols of Turkish history and culture.

The campus is compact and designed for pedestrians. Students and staff can move from place to place either through open courtyards or under cover. The campus utilizes a four by four meter modular design to accommodate different spatial needs.

The final stage of the Rumelifeneri campus construction plan was realized in 2018 with the completion of a sixth faculty building, an extension to the library, and several new dormitory buildings.

Notes and references

External links 

 Koc University homepage
 Koc University virtual tour
 Koc University library
 Koc University Football Team, Koç Rams
 Koc University Incubation Center
 KWORKS - Koç University Entrepreneurship Research Center

 
Educational institutions established in 1993
1993 establishments in Turkey
Private universities and colleges in Turkey
Sarıyer
Koç family